East Lynne is an English sensation novel of 1861 by Ellen Wood, writing as Mrs Henry Wood. A Victorian best-seller, it is remembered chiefly for its elaborate and implausible plot, centring on infidelity and double identities. There have been numerous stage and film adaptations.

The much-quoted line "Gone! And never called me mother!" (variant: "Dead! Dead! And never called me mother!") does not appear in the book; both variants come from later stage adaptations.

The book was originally serialised in The New Monthly Magazine between January 1860 and September 1861, being issued as a three-volume novel on 19 September 1861.

Plot summary 
Lady Isabel Vane is distraught when her beloved father dies suddenly and the earldom and all the property go to a distant relation, leaving her homeless and penniless. She is a beautiful and refined young woman, who (for lack of other options) marries the lawyer Archibald Carlyle who buys her former home, East Lynne.

Unfortunately his elder sister Cornelia also comes to live in East Lynne; she hates the marriage and, by taking over the household, makes Isabel's new life miserable. Mr Carlyle is a very kind man, who had previously had a friendship with local lady Barbara Hare, who had hoped to marry him. This creates an opportunity for jealousy and misunderstanding.

Isabel leaves her hard-working lawyer-husband and their infant children to elope with an aristocratic but poor Captain Francis Levison. This is because she jealously suspects her husband's friendship with Barbara Hare, and Levison misleads her into a wrong interpretation of a meeting between them. However, once abroad with Levison, Isabel realises he has no intention of marrying her, despite her having borne their illegitimate child. He deserts her.

Her cousin, Lord Mount Severn, comes to visit her in Europe and offers to support her. She finds out from him that her husband was not unfaithful. On the way back to England, there is a train accident; the baby is killed and Isabel, badly injured, is reported dead. Following this, Isabel is able—in disguise and under a new name—to take the position of governess in the household of her former husband and his new wife (Barbara Hare), allowing her to be close to her children.

This situation becomes a source of great misery, however, as the little boy William dies of tuberculosis. Mr Carlyle stands for Parliament, as does Sir Francis Levison, Isabel's seducer. It transpires that under the name Thorn, Levison had been guilty of the murder of Mr Hallijohn. But Richard Hare, the brother of Barbara, had been falsely accused of that murder and goes on the run.

When the facts eventually come to light, there is a hilarious and dramatic trial involving Afy Hallijohn as a reluctant witness. The pressure of keeping up a façade (e.g., wearing blue glasses, adopting a foreign accent) and being constantly reminded that her husband has moved on eventually physically weakens Isabel. On her deathbed she tells all to Carlyle, who forgives her.

Adaptations

There have been multiple adaptations for stage, radio, films and television. 

East Lynne has been adapted for the stage many times; the play was so popular that stock companies put on a performance whenever they needed guaranteed revenue. It became so common that theatres stuck with a badly received play famously would assuage audiences with the hopeful promise, "Next week, East Lynne!", which eventually became a punchline in comedies and cartoons, often as a sign outside a theatre. The play was staged so often that critic Sally Mitchell estimates some version was seen by audiences in either England or North America every week for over forty years.

A particularly effective use of the punchline is at the 59:10 mark of the 1936 movie, Libeled Lady. In the scene, Gladys (Jean Harlow's character) is riding in an open car with Haggerty (Spencer Tracy's character). She is rehearsing the scene with which she hopes to trap Connie Allenbury (Myrna Loy's character) into believing she has been trapped in a compromising position with Chandler (William Powell's character). Deliberately overacting, she says, "Connie Allenbury, you've taken from me the only thing I've ever loved. My husband!" She then turns to Haggarty and matter of factly asks, "How's that?" "Great", he replies, sarcastically. "Next week, East Lynne!"

The novel was first staged as Edith, or The Earl's Daughter in New York in 1861 and under its own name on 26 January 1863 in Brooklyn; by March of that year, "three competing versions were drawing crowds to New York theaters." The most successful version was written by Clifton W. Tayleur for actress Lucille Western, who was paid $350 a night for her performance as Isabel Vane. Western starred in East Lynne for the next 10 years. At least nine adaptations were made in all, not including plays such as The Marriage Bells that "used a different title for the sake of some copyright protection."

There have been many silent film versions of the book including a 1913 film. Another, starring Theda Bara, was made in 1916, and there was an Australian film six years later. In 1925, another version reached the screen which starred Alma Rubens, Edmund Lowe, Lou Tellegen and Leslie Fenton.

As the more melodramatic aspects of the story became dated, there were several parodies and burlesques made, including East Lynne in Bugville with Pearl White (1914), Mack Sennet's East Lynne with Variations (1917), and in 1931 the comedy East Lynne on the Western Front in which British soldiers fighting in the World War I stage a burlesqued version of the story.

A radio adaptation in seven parts was made for BBC Radio 4 by Michael Bakewell, with Rosemary Leach narrating as Mrs Wood, first broadcast in 1987.

1930 film
Leslie Halliwell cited in the 7th edition of 'Halliwell's Film Guide', (page 325), that the 1930 feature film, 'Ex-Flame', (starring Neil Hamilton), was "A modernized version", providing "... Unintentional ...laughs". He went on to quote Variety (magazine)'s contemporary review of it as "..Mush stuff for the women".

1931 film

A film version of East Lynne was nominated for the Academy Award for Best Picture in 1931. The movie was adapted from the novel by Tom Barry and Bradley King and directed by Frank Lloyd. The film is a melodrama starring Ann Harding, Clive Brook, Conrad Nagel and Cecilia Loftus. Only one copy of the film is known to exist. The screenplay was in turn novelized by Arline de Haas.

1952 film
The 1952 film Thai Ullam is a Tamil language adaptation of East Lynne.

Television 
In the 1970s a TV dramatisation was broadcast from The City Varieties Theatre in Leeds, with the audience all in Victorian costume and Queen Victoria in The Royal Box. The famous TV host of The Good Old Days, Leonard Sachs, was present to introduce the proceedings. 

The story was last refilmed in 1982, in a star-studded BBC made-for-television production starring amongst many others Martin Shaw, Gemma Craven, Lisa Eichhorn, Jane Asher, Annette Crosbie and Tim Woodward.

Critical assessment
Modern critics tend to impose their own, contemporary assessment on the work, and not consider it by its own standards. Some of this sort argue that the novel champions middle classes over the lower orders; others, however, find this claim "too simplistic" and argue that the novel "highlights the shortfalls inherent to bourgeois masculinity." Sally Mitchell argues that the novel simultaneously upholds and undermines middle-class values. 

Other critics include the late nineteenth century English novelist George Gissing, who read the book whilst staying in Rome in March 1898, wrote in his diary that it was "not at all a bad book, of its sort". Perhaps the most practical assessment came from one who produced the play many times, Tod Slaughter, the actor and theater manager. Norman Carter "Tod" Slaughter wrote: "No other play in its time has ever been more maligned, more burlesqued, more ridiculed, or consistently made more money".

Legacy
The town of East Lynne, Missouri took its name from the novel.

Notes

References
 Grilli Giorgia, "In volo, dietro la porta. Mary Poppins e Pamela Lyndon Travers". Società Editrice Il Ponte Vecchio. Cesena 1997 (ristampa 2002) 179–182
 Hughes, Winifred. The Maniac in the Cellar: Sensation Novels of the 1860s. Princeton: Princeton University Press, 1980.
 Mangham, Andrew. Violent Women and Sensation Fiction: Crime, Medicine and Victorian Popular Culture. Hampshire and New York: Palgrave Macmillan, 2007.
 Mitchell, Sally. Introduction. East Lynne. 1861. Reprint. New Jersey: Rutgers University Press, 1984.
 Pykett, Lyn. The "Improper" Feminine: The Women's Sensation Novel and the New Woman Writing. London and New York: Routledge, 1992.
 Rosenman, Ellen. "'Mimic Sorrows': Masochism and the Gendering of Pain in Victorian Melodrama." Studies in the Novel 35 (March 2003): 22–43.
 Trodd, Anthea. Domestic Crime in the Victorian Novel. New York: St. Martin's Press, 1989.
 Wynne, Deborah. The Sensation Novel and the Victorian Family Magazine. Hampshire and New York: Palgrave Macmillan, 2001.
 The Ghost Train (1941 comedy film) A female character disparages her older brother, saying that "you sound like something out of ''East Lynne.'

External links

 
 
 Review of a recent printing of East Lynne in the London Review of Books
 

1861 British novels
English novels
Victorian novels
Novels by Ellen Wood
British novels adapted into films
Sensation novels